The Britannia  is a Grade II listed public house at 5 Brewers Lane, Richmond, in the London Borough of Richmond upon Thames.

It was built in the 18th century, and the architect is not known.

References

External links
Official website

Commercial buildings completed in the 18th century
Grade II listed buildings in the London Borough of Richmond upon Thames
Grade II listed pubs in London
Pubs in the London Borough of Richmond upon Thames
Richmond, London